China Resources Beverage (Holdings) Ltd. or CR Beverage is the division of China Resources that sells soft drinks. Its head office is in the north area of the Hi-tech Park (新科技园 Xīn Kējì Yuán) in Nanshan District, Shenzhen. The company maintains regional offices in Beijing, Chengdu, Shanghai, Shenyang, and Shenzhen.

The brands owned by the company include C'estbon (S: 怡宝, T: 怡寳, P: Yíbǎo) water, Afternoon (S: 午后, T: 午後, P: Wǔhòu) tea, Fire (FIRE) coffee, Jialinshan (C: 加林山, P: Jiālínshān), Magic, and Zero Pascal. It is also known as China Resources C'estbon Food & Beverage.

On April 18, 2013, China Resources C'estbon sued Nongfu Spring, a rival company, accusing Nongfu of spreading false accusations against C'estbon.

References

Notes

External links
  China Resources Beverage
  C'estbon
  C'estbon water

Drink companies of China
Companies based in Shenzhen